The 2010 UEFA European Under-19 Championship was the ninth edition of UEFA's European Under-19 Championship since it was renamed from the original under-18 event, in 2001. France hosted the championship during July. Ukraine were the title holders, but failed to qualify for the finals. The host country won the tournament. The top six teams qualified for the 2011 Under-20 World Cup.

Qualification
Qualification for the final tournament was played over two stages:
 Qualification – 1 September 2009 – 30 November 2009
 Elite qualification – 1 March 2010 – 31 May 2010

The final tournament of the Championship was preceded by two qualification stages: a qualifying round and an Elite round. During these rounds, 52 national teams competed to determine the seven teams that would join the already qualified host nation France.

The qualifying round was played between 1 September and 30 November 2009. The 52 teams were divided into 13 groups of four teams, with each group being contested as a mini-tournament hosted by one of the group's teams. After all matches were played, the 13 group winners and 13 group runners-up advanced to the Elite round. Alongside the 26 winner and runner-up teams, the two best third-placed teams also qualified.

The following teams qualified for the tournament
 
 
 
  (host)

Squads

Group stage
Each group winner and runner-up advanced to the semi-finals. The top three teams in each group qualified for the 2011 Under-20 World Cup.

Tie-break criteria for teams even on points:
Higher number of points obtained in the group matches played among the teams in question
Superior goal difference resulting from the group matches played among the teams in question
Higher number of goals scored in the group matches played among the teams in question
If, after having applied the above criteria, two teams still have an equal ranking, the same criteria will be reapplied to determine the final ranking of the two teams. If this procedure does not lead to a decision, the following criteria will apply:
Results of all group matches:
Superior goal difference
Higher number of goals scored
Fair play ranking of the teams in question
Drawing of lots
If two teams which have the same number of points and the same number of goals scored and conceded play their last group match against each other and are still equal at the end of that match, their final rankings will be determined by kicks from the penalty mark and not by the criteria listed above

All times are Central European Time (UTC+2)

Group A

Group B

Knock-out stage

Bracket

Semi-finals

Final

Goalscorers

4 goals
  Dani Pacheco
3 goals
  Zvonko Pamić
  Cédric Bakambu
  Alexandre Lacazette
2 goals
  Franko Andrijašević
  Frank Nouble
  Rodrigo
  Gaël Kakuta
  Antoine Griezmann
1 goal
  David Alaba
  Marco Djuricin
  Gernot Trauner
  Filip Ozobić
  Arijan Ademi
  Thomas Cruise

  Matt Phillips
  John Bostock
  Enzo Reale
  Yannis Tafer
  Gilles Sunu
  Steven Berghuis
  Jerson Cabral
  Nélson Oliveira
  Sérgio Oliveira
  Rúben Pinto
  Thiago
  Ezequiel Calvente
  Rubén Rochina
  Sergio Gontán
  Sergio Canales
Own goal
  Bruno Martins Indi (for France)

Technical team selection 

Goalkeepers
  1. Matej Delač
  1. Declan Rudd
Defenders
  4. Marc Bartra
  2. Nathaniel Clyne
  3. Chris Mavinga
  2. Loïc Nego
  3. Carles Planas
  14. Gernot Trauner
  2. Ricardo van Rhijn

Midfielders
  7. Arijan Ademi
  8. Thiago
  13. Francis Coquelin
  8. Gueïda Fofana
  15. Zvonko Pamić
  8. Dean Parrett
  6. Oriol Romeu
  17. Sérgio Oliveira
Forwards
  17. Cédric Bakambu
  11. Jerson Cabral
  11. Antoine Griezmann
  7. Gaël Kakuta
  7. Keko
  11. Dani Pacheco

Tournament team ranking

  1. France
  2. Spain
  3. Croatia
  4. England
  5. Portugal
  6. Austria
  7. Netherlands
  8. Italy

References

External links

 
2010
2009–10 in French football
2010
UEFA
July 2010 sports events in Europe
2010 in youth association football